Clifford Matthew Coleman III (born January 22, 1998) is an American professional basketball player for Peristeri of the Greek Basket League. He played college basketball for the Texas Longhorns.

High school career
Coleman played basketball for Matthew Fontaine Maury High School in Norfolk, Virginia for two years. After his sophomore season, he transferred to Oak Hill Academy in Mouth of Wilson, Virginia. As a junior, Coleman helped his team win the High School National title. He averaged 11.3 points, 7.5 assists, 4.5 rebounds and 2.6 steals per game as a senior, helping Oak Hill finish with a 38–4 record. He was named Virginia Gatorade Player of the Year. Coleman played in the Jordan Brand Classic and finished with eight points, eights assists and three steals. He was a four-star recruit and committed to playing college basketball for Texas over an offer from Duke, among others. Coleman was drawn by his relationship with coach Shaka Smart.

College career
On January 10, 2018, Coleman registered his first career double-double with 17 points and 12 assists in a 99–98 win over TCU. On March 16, he recorded a career-high 25 points and four assists in an 87–83 overtime loss to seventh-seeded Nevada in the first round of the 2018 NCAA tournament. In his freshman season, he averaged 10.2 points per game, 4.1 assists and 2.5 rebounds per game, earning All-Big 12 Honorable Mention. Coleman averaged 9.8 points and 3.4 assists per game as a sophomore, while shooting 38.7 percent from the floor. For a second time, he was selected to the All-Big 12 Honorable Mention. On November 9, 2019, Coleman posted 22 points and seven assists in a 70–66 victory over Purdue. As a junior, he averaged 12.7 points, 3.4 assists and three rebounds per game. He was named to the Third Team All-Big 12. 

Coming into his senior season, Coleman was named to the Preseason All-Big 12 Team. On December 2, 2020, Coleman scored 22 points and hit the game-winning jump shot with 0.1 seconds remaining in a 69–67 win against North Carolina in the Maui Invitational championship. On March 13, 2021, he scored 30 points in a 91–86 win over Oklahoma State at the Big 12 tournament final. He was named tournament most outstanding player.

Professional career
After going undrafted in the 2021 NBA draft, Coleman joined the Sacramento Kings for the 2021 NBA Summer League. On September 28, 2021, he signed a contract with the Kings. He was waived prior to the start of the season. He was later picked up by Sacramento's G League affiliate, the Stockton Kings as an affiliate player.

On July 22, 2022, he has signed with Beşiktaş of the Basketbol Süper Ligi (BSL).

On December 9, 2022, he signed with AYOS Konyaspor of the Turkish Basketbol Süper Ligi (BSL).

On February 8, 2023, Coleman signed with Greek club Peristeri for the rest of the season.

National team career
Coleman represented the United States at the 2016 FIBA Americas Under-18 Championship. He averaged 7.8 points, 4.6 rebounds and 4.4 assists in 22.8 minutes per game, helping his team win the gold medal.

Career statistics

College

|-
| style="text-align:left;"| 2017–18 
| style="text-align:left;"| Texas
| 34 || 34 || 34.0 || .411 || .286 || .787 || 2.5 || 4.1 || 1.2 || .0 || 10.2
|-
| style="text-align:left;"| 2018–19 
| style="text-align:left;"| Texas 
| 37 || 37 || 30.7 || .388 || .326 || .785 || 2.1 || 3.4 || .8 || .1 || 9.8
|-
| style="text-align:left;"| 2019–20
| style="text-align:left;"| Texas
| 30 || 30 || 33.6 || .441 || .395 || .797 || 3.0 || 3.4 || 1.3 || .1 || 12.7
|-
| style="text-align:left;"| 2020–21
| style="text-align:left;"| Texas
| 27 || 27 || 34.4 || .485 || .377 || .813 || 3.5 || 4.0 || 1.2 || .1 || 13.2
|- class="sortbottom"
| style="text-align:center;" colspan="2"| Career
| 128 || 128 || 33.1 || .429 || .347 || .795 || 2.7 || 3.7 || 1.1 || .1 || 11.3

Personal life
Coleman's younger brother, Chase, plays college basketball for Virginia, playing as a walk-on in his freshman season.

References

External links
Texas Longhorns bio
USA Basketball bio

1998 births
Living people
American men's basketball players
American expatriate basketball people in Greece
American expatriate basketball people in Turkey
Basketball players from Norfolk, Virginia
Beşiktaş men's basketball players
Peristeri B.C. players
Point guards
Stockton Kings players
Texas Longhorns men's basketball players